The 1992–93 FA Cup was the 112th season of the FA Cup, also known as The Football Association Challenge Cup. It was won by Arsenal, who beat Sheffield Wednesday 2–1 in the replay after a 1–1 draw in the final at the old Wembley Stadium. The goals were scored by Ian Wright and Andy Linighan, who scored in the 119th minute. This was the last FA Cup final to be decided by a replay before final replays were abolished in 1999.

First round proper

Birmingham City and Peterborough United from the Football League First Division entered in this round along with all the Football League Second and Third Division teams plus three non-league clubs were given byes to this round: Witton Albion, Wycombe Wanderers and Woking. Maidstone United was included despite the team withdrawing from the Third Division before the start of the season. The first round matches were played on the weekend beginning 14 November 1992.

Second round proper

The second round matches were played on the weekend beginning 5 December 1992.

Third round proper

Teams from the Premier League and First Division (except Birmingham and Peterborough) entered in this round. The third round matches were played on the weekend beginning 2 January 1993.

Fourth round proper

The fourth round matches were played on the weekend beginning 23 January 1993.

Fifth round proper

The fifth round matches were played on the weekend beginning 13 February 1993.

Sixth round proper

The sixth round matches were played on the weekend beginning 6 March 1993.

Blackburn Rovers, Premier League title contenders, lost on penalties to Premier League relegation battlers Sheffield United to end their double hopes, while Sheffield Wednesday moved closer to a second domestic cup final in the same season by triumphing at Derby County.

Arsenal defeated Ipswich Town 4–2 at Portman Road to move closer to a second domestic cup final, possibly another one with Sheffield Wednesday, and their first FA Cup triumph since 1979.

Tottenham Hotspur beat Manchester City 4–2 at Maine Road to book a North London derby with Arsenal in the semi-final.  The match was suspended during the second half when a pitch invasion took place.

Semi-finals

The semi-final matches were played on the weekend beginning 3 April 1993.

Both semi-finals were derby matches, with Sheffield Wednesday and Sheffield United contesting the Steel City derby – which Wednesday won 2-1 – and Arsenal triumphing 1–0 over Tottenham in the North London derby.

Sheffield Wednesday advance to the FA Cup Final

Arsenal advance to the FA Cup Final

Final

The first final was held on 15 May at Wembley Stadium and finished 1–1, after extra time, with Arsenal winning the replay on 20 May, 2–1 also after extra-time. This made Arsenal the first side to win the FA Cup and League Cup in the same season, just weeks after they had beaten Sheffield Wednesday 2–1 in the League Cup final.

Replay

Media coverage
For the fifth consecutive season in the United Kingdom, the BBC were the free to air broadcasters while Sky Sports were the subscription broadcasters.

The matches shown live on the BBC were: Nottingham Forest vs Southampton (R3); Norwich City vs Tottenham Hotspur (R4); Sheffield United vs Manchester United (R5); Manchester City vs Tottenham Hotspur (QF); Arsenal vs Tottenham Hotspur (SF); and Sheffield Wednesday vs Arsenal in both the Final and its replay.

References

External links
 FA Cup 1992-1993

 
FA Cup seasons
Fa Cup, 1992-93
Fa Cup, 1992-93